Ridgetop is a city in Davidson and Robertson counties in the U.S. state of Tennessee. The population was 1,874 at the 2010 census.

Geography
Ridgetop is located in Robertson County except for two small portions of the city that fall in Davidson County.

There is a small man-made lake built to draw in tourism in the early 1900s.  Underneath the town is "Ridgetop Tunnel", a railroad tunnel bored in the early 1900s. When completed in 1905, it was the longest free-standing (i.e., with no columnar supports) tunnel in the world.

Demographics

2020 census

As of the 2020 United States census, there were 2,155 people, 803 households, and 613 families residing in the city.

2000 census
As of the census of 2000, there were 1,083 people, 385 households, and 314 families residing in the city. The population density was 678.3 people per square mile (261.3/km2). There were 399 housing units at an average density of 249.9 per square mile (96.3/km2). The racial makeup of the city was 96.12% White, 1.48% African American, 0.09% Native American, 0.55% Asian, 0.18% from other races, and 1.57% from two or more races. Hispanic or Latino of any race were 1.02% of the population.

There were 385 households, out of which 32.7% had children under the age of 18 living with them, 67.5% were married couples living together, 9.6% had a female householder with no husband present, and 18.4% were non-families. 16.1% of all households were made up of individuals, and 7.3% had someone living alone who was 65 years of age or older. The average household size was 2.71 and the average family size was 3.00.

In the city, the population was spread out, with 23.4% under the age of 18, 6.8% from 18 to 24, 26.6% from 25 to 44, 28.3% from 45 to 64, and 14.9% who were 65 years of age or older. The median age was 41 years. For every 100 females, there were 99.4 males. For every 100 females age 18 and over, there were 96.2 males.

The median income for a household in the city was $52,381, and the median income for a family was $57,589. Males had a median income of $40,813 versus $26,250 for females. The per capita income for the city was $19,610. About 4.3% of families and 4.5% of the population were below the poverty line, including 4.2% of those under age 18 and 15.5% of those age 65 or over.

Filming
Scenes for Hannah Montana: The Movie were filmed at the special events facility "Smiley Hollow". The movie was released April 10, 2009.

Notable residents
Grandpa Jones - American banjo player and "old time" country and gospel music singer and member of the Grand Ole Opry
David "Stringbean" Akeman - American country music banjo player and comedy musician best known for his role on the hit television show, Hee Haw, and as a member of the Grand Ole Opry.  He and his wife were neighbors of Grandpa Jones' and were both murdered at their home in 1973
Willie Nelson - American country music singer and songwriter who wrote some of country's biggest hits with several crossover hits by many artists such as Roy Orbison. Willie owned a ranch in Ridgetop, TN from 1963 to 1970 where he wrote many of his songs. It burned down in 1970 and Willie took it as a sign and moved back to Texas.

References

Cities in Tennessee
Cities in Robertson County, Tennessee
Cities in Davidson County, Tennessee
Cities in Nashville metropolitan area